is a 1955 black-and-white Japanese film directed by Seiji Hisamatsu and produced by Nikkatsu.

Cast 
 Masao Mishima as Ishiwarai, the head of Police
 Hisaya Morishige as policeman Yoshii
 Yukiyo Toake
 Rentarō Mikuni as policeman Hakanawa
 Miki Odagiri
 Yūnosuke Itō
 Jō Shishido as policeman Yabuta
 Terumi Niki as Yukiko
 Haruko Sugimura as Moyo Sugita

References

External links 
 

Japanese black-and-white films
1955 films
Films directed by Seiji Hisamatsu
Nikkatsu films
Japanese drama films
1955 drama films
1950s Japanese films